SCRC may refer to:

 The Scottish Commission for the Regulation of Care, a commission of regulation and inspection of all care services in Scotland
 Special Collections Research Center at the College of William & Mary